Antoine "Arthur" Blavier (28 January 1914 – 15 September 1991) was a Belgian football referee.

Refereeing career
Blavier spent his career refereeing in the Belgian First Division A, the top flight of Belgian football. In 1960, he was appointed as a FIFA referee.

In 1962, Blavier was selected as a referee for the 1962 FIFA World Cup, where he officiated a group stage match between England and Bulgaria.

Two years later, Blavier was appointed as a referee for the 1964 European Nations' Cup, where he officiated a semi-final match between Spain and Hungary.

Blavier retired from refereeing in 1964.

References

External links
 
 
 

1914 births
1991 deaths
Sportspeople from Namur (city)
Belgian football referees
1962 FIFA World Cup referees
1964 European Nations' Cup referees